Urupia is an extinct genus of salamander in what is now Russia from the Bathonian aged Itat Formation. It was described by P. P. Skutschas and S. A. Krasnolutskii in 2011, and the type species is U. monstrosa.

References

Jurassic salamanders
Middle Jurassic amphibians
Fossil taxa described in 2011
Prehistoric amphibian genera